Heimioporus retisporus is a species of bolete fungus found in China. It is the type species of the genus Heimioporus.

References

External links

retisporus
Fungi of China